The Grand Hotel Kempinski High Tatras is a five-star hotel operated by Kempinski Hotels S.A. located on the shores of Štrbské pleso (Tschirmer See) in High Tatras, Slovakia.

The hotel was opened in May 2009 after EUR 42 million  reconstruction of the former spa house complex Hviezdoslav. Grand Hotel Kempinski High Tatras has 98 rooms and suites plus spa & wellness services.

Location

The hotel is located in the immediate proximity of the alpine lake Štrbské pleso, situated at an elevation of 1,351 metres (4432 feet) above sea level.

History

The hotel consists of three interlinked historical buildings built over a period of 34 years, one next to another, on the Štrbské Pleso moraine: Jánošík (1893), Kriváň (1906), and Hviezdoslav (1923). They are distinguished by their varied architectural forms, which range from historicist design to the modern style of the 1920s. Together, they give the impression of picturesque and quaint construction, with various roof shapes that contribute to the panorama of the surrounding Tatras peaks.

The oldest building, dating to 1893, is Jánošík. Originally, Jozef Szentiványi had it built for his own needs naming it Jozef's villa. The romantic small villa, decorated with paintings and engravings on its facades and with richly furnished interiors, was visited by the highest levels of the aristocracy. Guests included several family members of the House of Habsburg and the House of Coburg, the King of Serbia - Milan and others.

After the creation and foundation of Czechoslovakia, the villa was given the name Jánošík, after the Slovak's national hero.

Other buildings have been connected to the original building. Kriváň ranked among the three grand hotels of the Tatras at the time of its construction. The project was developed by the architect Guido Hoepfner in cooperation with Géza Györgyi in the style of Belle Époque, an era dominated by the Secession style and thus the hotel, including all the furnishings, was designed in that style. The hotel also included spas. Archduke Charles Stephen and his family were among the first guests of the grand hotel. After the founding of Czechoslovakia, the hotel was renamed Kriváň, after the Slovaks' national peak.

Grand Hotel Hviezdoslav was opened in 1923 and bears the name of the Slovak poet. The interior furnishings of the hotel were designed in the style of RondoCubism, the Czechoslovak national style at that time.

Before the FIS World Cup In 1935, the tourist restaurant was replaced by a French style dining room and bar, which according to the contemporary critics was without equal in all the Tatras.

Starting in 1953, the hotel complex was used as a sanatorium before gradually falling into disrepair and finally, because of its poor condition, being closed.

Reconstruction of the complex in 2003 - 2007

In 2003, architect Peter Černo prepared a study of the reconstruction and building of the former treatment house Hviezdoslav. The aim of the project was to transform the historically protected buildings (from a registered monuments in 1963) into a luxurious five-star hotel that met the expectations and requirements of the future operator - Kempinski. When modifying the exterior, this ambition was to be as close to the original historic appearance as possible. During the preparations, he sought archival materials, historical photos and other documents, all of which were used during the reconstruction.

The renewal of the hotel was a difficult process and took more than four years to finish. The complex is located in the Tatra National Park. It is also a Grade II listed building, making it a national monument.

Gallery

External links

 Kempinski corporate website
 Best Hotel Properties website

References

High Tatras
Hotels in Slovakia
Kempinski Hotels